Poland currently operates a single research reactor, Maria. It has no operational nuclear reactors for power production, but is to start construction of a plant with three Westinghouse AP1000 reactors in 2026, and is also intending to build small modular reactors.

Poland operates a nuclear waste disposal site in Różan, named Krajowe Składowisko Odpadów Promieniotwórczych (National Nuclear Waste Disposal Site) since 1961, where waste from the current and past reactors is being stored, without any incidents throughout its operational history.

Background 

Around 70% of the nation's electricity is currently produced by burning hard coal and lignite (of which Poland has the EU's largest reserves), at industrial facilities and large central generating stations such as the 5 GW Bełchatów Power Station. With the need to reduce carbon dioxide emissions for environmental, climate, and economic reasons, the country continues to explore deployment of nuclear reactors for electricity generation and industrial process heat.

National Nuclear Regulator
Nuclear activities in Poland are regulated by the national nuclear regulator Panstwowa Agencja Atomistyki (PAA). The PAA is a modern nuclear regulator who is an active member of European and international nuclear regulatory organizations.

International Relations
Poland is a signatory to all major international treaties regarding nuclear energy, a member state of European Atomic Energy Community, and one of the founding member states of the International Atomic Energy Agency in 1957.

History

1980 through 2000
In the 1980s, the Zarnowiec Nuclear Power Plant was under construction, but was abandoned on 4 September 1990.

2000 through 2020
A 2006 feasibility study suggested it optimal to build an 11.5 GWe capacity nuclear power plant. However, this proving unaffordable in the immediate future, Poland decided to build a 4.5 GWe nuclear power plant by 2030. In 2007, a draft energy policy proposed a 10 GWe nuclear capacity by 2030 to provide 10% of electricity.  The deadline gives an estimated ten years for investment and construction and five years of public campaigning.

In July 2006, Poland joined Lithuania, Estonia, and Latvia to build a new nuclear power plant in Lithuania to replace the Ignalina Nuclear Power Plant being shut down due to pressure from the EU.  Poland would invest 22% with these other countries into the project, the Visaginas NPP main site would have been under principal construction by early 2016 with necessary prerequisite planning, financing, regulatory agency approval and logistical ground work in terms of infrastructure modernization and expansion finished and in place by 2015. The plant commercial operations scheduled to begin by 31 December 2022. The total costs of the project was to be EUR 6 billion. Poland was guaranteed to have 1,200 MWe from the power plant and has upgraded transmission capacity between Lithuania and Poland. After the nuclear project was abandoned, Lithuania instead became an importer of electricity from Poland.

In a public opinion poll, 60% of the population supported construction of a nuclear power plant in Poland to reduce its dependence on foreign sources of energy. Additionally, 48% supported construction of a nuclear power plant in their neighborhood, citing local benefits that include lower energy costs.

The popular Baltic Sea resort Mielno was one of three sites selected, however in February 2012, residents voted overwhelmingly against the plan. Some 94 percent of the 2,389 people who took part in a referendum opposed the plant and only 5 percent supported it.

In 2014, under the government of Prime Minister Donald Tusk, Poland's Nuclear Power Program was adopted. Through the early 2020s the Polish Nuclear Power Program was managed by the group EJ1 of the state-owned utility PGE Polska Grupa Energetyczna.

2020 to current
Growing environmental, climate change, and economic concerns among the Polish public, policymakers, and businesses continues to drive Polish interest in nuclear power in the 2020s. The most significant efforts are those of the state-owned nuclear development company Polskie Elektrownie Jądrowe regarding large light water reactors in the 1000MWe to 1250MWe range and those of private industrial companies pursuing small modular reactors for deployment at industrial sites.

In 2021 Polish Prime Minister Mateusz Morawiecki, jointly with prime ministers of Hungary, France, Czech Republic, Romania, Slovak Republic and Slovenia, signed an open letter to European Commission calling for recognition of role of nuclear power as the only non-intermittent low-carbon energy source currently available at industrial scale in Europe.

In April 2021 Polish Academy of Sciences (PAN) published a comprehensive report on perspectives of decarbonization of energy sector, calling for increased use of "any low-carbon energy sources", including renewable energy and nuclear power. Minister of energy Michał Kurtyka declared it's not realistic to look at low-carbon energy sector without nuclear power.

A November 2021 poll indicated 74% in favor of building nuclear power plants in Poland in general, 58% supporting their location in their neighborhood and 39% opposing the latter. 82% believe nuclear power plants contribute to energy resilience of the country.

2020s PEJ Large Light Water Reactors Proposals
In the late 2010s and early 2020s, a special purpose entity of Poland's largest energy group PGE Polska Grupa Energetyczna known as EJ1 led the siting and development efforts for large light water reactors in Poland. In 2021, the functions of PGE EJ1 were transferred to a new state-owned entity, Polskie Elektrownie Jądrowe (PEJ), which was charged with developing 6 to 9GWe of proven, large-scale, Generation III(+) pressurized water reactors such as the AP1000, APR-1400, and EPR. It is 100% owned by the State Treasury.

PEJ is conducting siting studies and planning for construction and operation of six 1-1.5 GWe reactors starting from 2026 with the planned completion of first reactor by 2033 and all of them connected to the grid by 2040 with total nameplate capacity of 6-9 GWe. The siting investigation conducted by PGE and PEJ included screening 92 potential locations before detailed studies were conducted two final candidate sties. Two sites in Pomorskie - Żarnowiec and Lubiatowo-Kopalino – were subject to more detailed scrutiny and the results published in the Environmental Impact Assessment (EIA) Report submitted to the General Director for Environmental Protection on March 29, 2022. The EIA considered multiple reactors generating up to 3,750MWe at the site.

On December 22, 2021, PEJ announced the preferred location for Poland's first commercial nuclear power plant as the Baltic Sea coastal commune of Choczewo in Wejherowo County, Pomeranian Voivodeship at a site called Lubiatowo-Kopalino.

In October 2022, Poland announced that it had selected Westinghouse to build the first three-unit plant, with construction to start in 2026 and commissioning of the first reactor scheduled for 2033. A formal decision on a second three units is to be taken at a later date.

2020s Commercial Large Pressurized Water Reactors Proposals
In October 2022, Polish utilities PGE and ZE PAK announced an agreement with Korea Hydro & Nuclear Power to explore building a number of APR-1400 reactors near ZE PAK's coal-fired plant at Pątnów. This development effort is led by private industry and is separate from (and in addition to) the government-led effort with PEJ.

2020s Industrial Small Modular Reactors Proposals
Private chemical industry producer Synthos (owned by Michał Sołowow) plans deployment of a GE Hitachi BWRX-300 SMR in its plant in Oświęcim. In August 2021 Synthos has been joined by ZE PAK coal power station (owned by Zygmunt Solorz), with both planning construction of six 300 MW reactors.

In 2022 KGHM, one of the largest Poland's consumers of electricity, declared that shifting from coal to nuclear power is the only way for European industries to grow and remain competitive. KGHM signed a contract for delivery of VOYGR SMR units with NuScale.

KGHM and joint venture Orlen Synthos Green Energy submitted applications on July 8, 2022 to the PAA for formal General Opinions on their chosen reactor technologies. These applications mark the first licensing action for SMRs in Poland. Under Polish regulations, the President of the PAA must provide a response to the applications within six months, unless an exception is taken.

See also
List of commercial nuclear reactors#Poland
List of nuclear research reactors#Poland

External Links
Republic of Poland, "Polish Atom" [Polish language] - https://www.gov.pl/web/polski-atom
Polish Nuclear Power Program (2020) [English language] - https://www.gov.pl/attachment/4cddd10a-5e8b-414d-bb95-670f6507d73e

References

Energy in Poland